Dale Newton (born 19 February 1983) is an Australian former professional rugby league footballer who played for the Cronulla-Sutherland Sharks and the South Sydney Rabbitohs in the National Rugby League between 2003-2006. He played at Prop.

References

1983 births
Australian rugby league players
Cronulla-Sutherland Sharks players
South Sydney Rabbitohs players
Rugby league props
Living people
Rugby league players from Sydney